The Lesotho A–Division is the second-tier league of football in Lesotho. It operates under the auspices of the Lesotho Football Association.

Organization 
The league is divided into a Northern Stream and Southern Stream. Teams compete in their own streams during the regular season. The top four teams from each stream then combine for a play-off tournament to determine which club is promoted to the Lesotho Premier League.

Sponsorship
Vodacom had been a significant sponsor of the league until 2017. The league was without a sponsor until September 2021 when the Lesotho Post Bank signed a three-year commitment which included naming the league the Lesotho Post Bank League. The final-eight play-offs have been sponsored by Nedbank, a financial services provider from South Africa, since 2019.

List of Champions

References 

Second level football leagues in Africa